Jyoti Prasad Das is an Indian politician and member of the Asom Gana Parishad. Das was member of the Assam Legislative Assembly from the  Boko constituency in South Kamrup district.

References 

Asom Gana Parishad politicians
Living people
Assam politicians
Assam MLAs 1996–2001
Assam MLAs 2006–2011
People from Kamrup district
Year of birth missing (living people)